Teven may refer to:

Teven, New South Wales, Australia
Teven Jenkins (born 1998), American football player

See also
Tevin (disambiguation)